Roen Nelson (born 8 April 1980) is a Jamaican international footballer who plays for Portmore United, as a striker.

Career
Nelson has played in Jamaica for Portmore United, in Trinidad for Joe Public, and in China for Chengdu Blades.

Nelson also earned twelve caps for the Jamaica national team between 2002 and 2008.

References

1980 births
Living people
Jamaican footballers
Jamaica international footballers
Expatriate footballers in China
Expatriate footballers in Trinidad and Tobago
TT Pro League players
TT Super League players
National Premier League players

Association football forwards
Chengdu Tiancheng F.C. players